The Sculptors Society of Canada (SSC) promotes and exhibits contemporary Canadian sculpture.

Founded by Canadian sculptors Frances Loring, Florence Wyle, Elizabeth Wyn Wood, Wood's teacher and husband Emanuel Hahn, Henri Hébert and Alfred Laliberté,  the Sculptors Society of Canada has been exhibiting sculpture in Canada since 1928, particularly in Montreal, Ottawa and Toronto.

The Canadian Sculpture Centre is the Society's public exhibit gallery, and is located on Church Street in Toronto.

References

External links
 Sculptors Society of Canada

Arts organizations based in Canada
Art museums and galleries in Ontario
Sculpture galleries in Canada
Museums in Toronto
1928 in art
1928 establishments in Ontario
Arts organizations established in 1928